The Centre for Continuing Education (CCE) is Australia's longest-standing provider of adult education, offering more than 700 short courses ranging from professional development to languages and the arts. CCE is a division of the University of Sydney, Australia. The centre was inaugurated in 1984 and has origins dating back almost 100 years earlier, with a series of university extension lectures that later evolved into a formal program of adult education courses.

Today, CCE offers a growing number of continuing education courses and corporate training options. These have been instrumental to the organisation's growth and its strategic direction. Subjects offered include web development, business analytics, digital marketing, business communications, project management and business management. Courses are delivered online and face-to-face, by industry practitioners as well as university academics. CCE also maintains an ongoing commitment to arts and humanities subjects such as languages, philosophy, history, music appreciation and creative writing.

History

Origins in university extension lectures 
The Centre for Continuing Education was formally established in 1984, evolving out of almost a century of achievement as an adult education provider until then. Records indicate that the Centre originated in a series of extension lectures begun in 1886 at The University of Sydney, itself founded in 1850. These were modeled after similar lectures developed in English universities, notably at Oxford and Cambridge. Following a period of education reform in the late 19th century, extension education was introduced as ‘a system of lectures and classes for adults in towns away from universities’, which sought to provide university-level education for working men, and increase access to education for women.

The University of Sydney established its Extension Board in 1892 to formalise the funding, delivery and support of these lectures. The first of these was on ‘Greek life and art’, a series delivered in 1892 by Louisa MacDonald, MA. MacDonald subsequently became the first Principal of Women's College at the university. She was paid £30 (AUD 60) to teach the course and participants each paid five shillings (50 cents) to attend.

The lectures, mostly held out of work hours, were later expanded to include literary, history and other topics. According to university Senate minutes, lecturers were expected to deliver a high standard of tuition. They were required to distribute a printed syllabus of the course and questions on the content, which course participants were expected to answer in writing.

The courses continued to grow in popularity and scope, and the Extension Board's Annual Report 1904-05 reported that annual attendances grew from 700 in 1901 to 1,500 five years later. Lectures on agriculture and popular science were added to the roster, and presenters from beyond the traditional Sydney community were invited to deliver courses.

Meanwhile, the Extension Board began to form relationships with increasingly influential educators and policymakers. Foremost among them was Albert Mansbridge, founder in 1903 of the British Workers Education Association (WEA). A series of high-level discussions between Extension Board members and Mansbridge led to the founding of a Sydney WEA college in 1913.

This in turn led to a collaborative partnership between The University of Sydney, the Extension Board and WEA that was to last more than 70 years. In 1914, urged by Extension Board leaders, the government of New South Wales agreed to make a special annual grant to The University of Sydney to continue to deliver its so-called Tutorial Classes to the public. These and the WEA lectures were delivered at various locations in and around the University of Sydney campus and in regional NSW.

The two organisations initially had a separate focus, with the Tutorial Classes delivering humanities classes and WEA focusing on practical skills. However, the two areas continued to overlap across almost seven decades.

Growth as professional development provider 
The University of Sydney's Tutorial Classes grew in popularity through both world wars, although funding and enrolments dropped briefly during the Great Depression of the 1930s. Demand for various subjects also fluctuated in the postwar years. The 1950s saw a renewed demand for the humanities-led content of the Tutorial Classes. By contrast, the 1960s saw a rise in demand for continuing education, particularly refresher courses designed to help trained workers stay up to date.

Responding to this growing demand for professional development, in 1963, the University of Sydney founded its Department of Adult Education, catering to working Australians wishing to broaden their interests. A Board of Adult Education was founded at the university in 1977, replacing the longstanding Extension Board. This body continued to innovate the way in which adult and continuing education might be maintained and developed at the university.

The 1970s and 80s saw continued growth in demand for adult education at The University of Sydney. In his book, ‘A Special and Distinctive Role’ in Adult Education: WEA Sydney 1953 – 2000, historian Darryl Dymock attributes the increased demand to a combination of factors. These include decreased work hours, increased leisure and higher life expectancy. Australia's increasing national wealth was another factor, thanks largely to the resources boom that began in the 1970s.

The Centre for Continuing Education today 
Recognising the growth in demand for professional development at the university and worldwide, the present-day Centre for Continuing Education was founded in 1984. The centre is a self-funded unit within the Deputy Vice Chancellor (Education) (DVCE) portfolio, with no internal or external funding. CCE's revenue falls under The University of Sydney's Continuing Education category, which includes other non-award courses. The Centre flourished after launching, with inaugural director D.G. Peat working hard to build its profile through the press, radio and leaflets.

CCE's original mandate was ‘to provide both vocational and general education for post-qualified members of the public’. Its program had four main components: (a) courses for the general public, especially in the arts and humanities; (b) courses designed for various professional groups, including teachers; (c) preparation courses to help matriculation students qualify later for studies at The University of Sydney; and (d) public lectures funded by donations given to the university for this purpose.

These still define CCE's offering four decades later. The centre also began providing more administrative support to the university, organising courses, lectures, seminars and tutorials with a continuing education objective.

CCE today is unique in its spectrum of offerings not available at other continuing education providers, including at community colleges or adult learning institutes. Reflecting market trends and demand, since 2020, the centre has continued to build its portfolio of professional development courses. CCE recognises its role in the current era of the 60-year curriculum, in which fast, practical short courses are increasingly accepted as a complement or alternative to formal postgraduate qualifications. In 2021, CCE's top three learning categories in terms of revenue were Business and Management, Information Technology and Project Management. Its top three categories for enrolments were Information Technology, Business and Management, and Language and Culture. Corporate group training, available for all subjects offered, contributes to a large proportion of CCE's annual revenue.

Campus 
The Centre for Continuing Education is located at the University of Sydney's campus at 160 Missenden Road in Newtown, Sydney. The present building offers eight training rooms, each catering for up to 30 participants and replete with secure, modern audiovisual technology. Workshops are held on campus year-round: during business hours, after hours, and on weekends. CCE courses are also held at other locations in Sydney, including the Grace Building (CBD), Rydges Hotel (Camperdown) and Parkroyal (Parramatta). Several courses are held at specialist locations, such as the movie discussion course held at Dendy Cinema.

The centre was refurbished in 2019, with improved technology that has enabled it to grow its online offerings, which have increased since the global COVID-19 pandemic. The online courses enable a growing cohort of interstate and overseas participants to benefit from CCE's industry-leading content. The courses are delivered via video conferencing.

CCE's face-to-face as well as online courses feature a discussion-rich, interactive format, with participants able to receive live presenter feedback on their responses to real-life scenarios. Each course listed on the CCE website is linked to an up-to-date calendar, listing upcoming on-campus or online sessions.

Community Engagement 
As part of its original commitment to the wider community, the Centre for Continuing Education offers several free public initiatives each year. These support The University of Sydney's own community engagement initiatives.

Free webinars held within recent years by our highly popular presenters include ‘The Psychology of Resilience and Mental Stamina,’ by Eleanor Shakiba; ‘Social Media's Impact on Education,’ by Lynsey Fraser; and ‘Project Management Panel Discussion,’ with Graeme Gherashe, Julien Pollack and Fiona Homann. Webinar highlights are released on CCE's YouTube channel.

References

External links 
 Centre for Continuing Education

Centre for Continuing Education
Adult education in Australia
1886 establishments in Australia
Newtown, New South Wales